Quinsaloma Canton is a canton of Ecuador, located in the  Los Ríos Province.  Its capital is the town of Quinsaloma.

Demographics
Ethnic groups as of the Ecuadorian census of 2010:
Mestizo  69.8%
Montubio  19.7%
Afro-Ecuadorian  5.2%
White  4.3%
Indigenous  0.8%
Other  0.3%

References

Cantons of Los Ríos Province